Ho is a Korean family name, a single-syllable masculine Korean given name, and an element in two-syllable Korean given names. The meaning differs based on the hanja used to write it.

Family name
As a family name, Ho may be written with three different hanja. Those with the family name meaning "retinue" may belong to one of four different bon-gwan:  
Naju, Jeollanam-do
Boan, Buan, Jeollabuk-do
Baekcheon, Sacheon, Gyeongsangnam-do
Jeonju, Jeollabuk-do
The 2000 South Korean census found 6,106 people with these family names.

Given name
There are 49 hanja with the reading "ho" (with variant forms of three of them) on the South Korean government's official list of hanja which may be registered for use in given names; common ones are listed in the table at right.

People with the single-syllable given name Ho include:
Kim Ho (born 1944), South Korean football manager
Im Ho (born 1970), South Korean actor
Lim Ho (footballer) (born 1979), South Korean football striker (Korea National League)

Several given names containing this syllable were popular for newborn boys in South Korea in various decades of the 20th century, including:
Byung-ho, 3rd place in 1940
Jin-ho, 8th place in 1960, 7th place in 1980
Joon-ho, 6th place in 1970, 4th place in 1980, 7th place in 1990
Jung-ho, 5th place in 1950, 4th place in 1960, 7th place in 1970
Min-ho, 9th place in 1980
Sung-ho, 6th place in 1950, 1st place in 1960, 2nd place in 1970
Young-ho, 1st place in 1940, 2nd place in 1950, 3rd place in 1960

Other given names containing this syllable include:

First syllable
Ho-jin
Ho-jun
Ho-jung
Ho-sung

Second syllable
Chang-ho
Jae-ho
Ji-ho
Kwang-ho
Kyung-ho

 
Seok-ho
Seung-ho
Tae-ho
Won-ho

See also
List of Korean given names

References

Korean-language surnames
Korean masculine given names